This is a list of Illinois State University alumni who are notable enough to warrant an article in Wikipedia.  The list is organized by general fields of achievement.

Business

Education

Journalism and letters

 Todd Heisler – photojournalist and winner of Pulitzer Prize for Feature Photography
 Richard Roeper – author, columnist, film critic for Chicago Sun-Times, co-host of television's At the Movies with Ebert & Roeper
 Randy Salerno – Emmy award–winning news anchor at WGN-TV and WBBM-TV in Chicago

Law
 Michael P. McCuskey – Federal Judge
 Owen P. Thompson - Illinois District Judge

Literature
 Norbert Blei – author of the Chicago trilogy of Neighborhoods, The Ghost of Sandburg-Es Phizzog, and Chi Town.
 Mort Castle – writer specializing in the horror genre. He has written seven novels, two short story collections, and hundreds of "shorter works."
 Kate Charles – mystery novelist who bases all of her novels out of the Church of England. Her works include Evil Angels Among Them, Unruly Passions, and Cruel Habitations.
 Eric Rohmann – author and illustrator of children's books. He received the 2003 Caldecott medal for My Friend Rabbit. He also received a 1995 Caldecott Honor book award for Time Flies. His other titles include The Cinder Cats and The Prairie Train.
Lester W. Smith – game designer specializing in role-playing games. Creator of the Origins Award winning game Dragon Dice.

Music  
 Lil Bibby - rapper, producer, and record executive
 Suzy Bogguss – country music singer and guitarist.
 Syleena Johnson – musician 
 Gregory Kunde – operatic tenor 
 Michelle Williams (attended) – musician, Destiny's Child

Science
 Malcolm L. McCallum - Environmental/Conservation Scientist, herpetologists
 Jenny P. Y. Ting - Immunologist

Government

Federal Government
 Adam Kinzinger – serves as a U.S. Representative for Illinois's 16th congressional district.
 Thomas R. Lamont – Assistant Secretary of the Army (Manpower and Reserve Affairs) (June 26, 2009 – October 1, 2014)
 Donald McHenry – former United States Ambassador to the United Nations (1979–81).

State Government
 Pamela Althoff, Republican member of the Illinois Senate (2003–present) and Mayor of McHenry, Illinois (2001-2003).
 Bob Bacon, Democratic member of the Colorado Senate (2005-2013) and Colorado House of Representatives (1997-2003).
 Jason Barickman, Republican member of the Illinois Senate (2013–present).
 Scott M. Bennett – Democratic member of the Illinois Senate (2015–present).
 Thomas M. Bennett, Republican member of the Illinois House of Representatives (2015–present).
 Jennifer Bertino-Tarrant, Democratic member of the Illinois Senate (2013–present) and Will County Regional Superintendent of Schools (2007-2013).
 William B. Black, Republican member of Illinois House of Representatives. 
 Jim Durkin, Republican Minority Leader and member of Illinois House of Representatives (2006–present).
 Josh Harms, Republican member of the Illinois House of Representatives (2013-2015).
 Jay Hoffman, Democratic member of the Illinois House of Representatives (2013–present). He previously served from 1995 to 2001.
 Lyman Beecher Kellogg – President of Emporia State University from 1865 to 1871; 14th Kansas Attorney General.
 Frank Mautino, Illinois Auditor General (2015–present) and Democratic member of the Illinois House of Representatives (1991-2015).
 Jerry L. Mitchell, Republican member of the Illinois House of Representatives (1995-2012).
 Rosemary Mulligan, Republican member of the Illinois House of Representatives (1993-2013).
 Laura Murphy, Democratic member of the Illinois Senate (2015–present).
 Michele Reagan – 27th Secretary of State of Arizona
 Kitty Rhoades, Republican member of the Wisconsin State Assembly (1998-2010).
 Dan Rutherford, Illinois Treasurer (2011-2015) and gubernatorial candidate 2014 Republican primary.
 Sue Scherer, Democratic member of the Illinois House of Representatives (2013–present).
 Elgie Sims, Democratic member of the Illinois House of Representatives (2012–present).
 Thomas P. Sinnett, State Representative, Illinois House of Representatives (1924-1938), Democratic Floor Leader (1933-1934)
 Arthur Turner, House Majority Leader and Democratic member of the Illinois House of Representatives (1981-2010).
 Tammie Wilson, Republican member of the Alaska House of Representatives (2009–present).
 Christine Winger, Republican member of the Illinois House of Representatives (2015–present).

Local Government
 Jim Ardis, Mayor of Peoria, Illinois (2005–present).
 Denny Doyle, Mayor of Beaverton, Oregon (2009–present).
 J. Michael Houston, Mayor of Springfield, Illinois from 1979-1987 and 2011-2015.
 George P. McLain (1847–1930), Los Angeles City Council member at the turn of the 19th–20th centuries.
 Mboka Mwilambwe, first African-American mayor of Bloomington, Illinois
 Harry Osterman, member of the Chicago City Council from the 48th ward (2011–present)

Sports

 Jeremy Accardo was a relief pitcher (2005–12) for several Major League Baseball teams.
 Dave Bergman is a former Major League Baseball first baseman (1975, 77–92).   He was a member of the 1984 World Series champion Detroit Tigers.  His uniform #12 has been retired by the ISU baseball team.
 Cathy Boswell was a member of the 1984 U.S. Olympic gold medal basketball team. She played professional basketball in Italy.
 Duane Butler was a professional football linebacker (1997-2006).
Lee "Buzz" Capra is a former All-Star Major League baseball pitcher (1971–77).  He led the National League in ERA in 1974.
Jackie Carmichael (born 1990) is a basketball player
 Aveion Cason is a former NFL running back (2001–08).
 Doug Collins is a television sports commentator and former head coach of the Chicago Bulls, Detroit Pistons, Philadelphia 76ers and Washington Wizards.
 Neal Cotts is a Major League Baseball relief pitcher (2003–present).  He was a member of the 2005 World Series champion Chicago White Sox.
 Paul DeJong is a Major League Baseball infielder for the St. Louis Cardinals.
 Luke Drone is a former NFL player and current AF2 player. 
 Eric Eckenstahler, former Major League Baseball pitcher, played for the Detroit Tigers
Steve Fisher is a retired college basketball coach, having been head coach at San Diego State University (1999-2017) and Michigan (1989–97).  He led the Michigan Wolverines to the 1989 NCAA Men's Division I Basketball Championship.
 Kevin Glenn is a CFL quarterback.  A finalist for the league's MVP award in 2007, he has played for several CFL teams, most recently with the Saskatchewan Roughriders.
 James "Boomer" Grigsby is a former NFL fullback (2005–08), playing most of his career for the Kansas City Chiefs.
 Shelby Harris is an NFL defensive end.
 Brent Hawkins is a former NFL defensive end (2006–07), playing his entire NFL career for the Jacksonville Jaguars.  He most recently played for the Saskatchewan Roughriders of the CFL.
 Robert Hawkins was a professional basketball player (1975–79).
 Matt Herges was a Major League Baseball relief pitcher (1999–2009).
 Brandon Joyce was a professional football offensive lineman for several teams.
 Ed Kinsella was the first athlete from ISU to play in Major League Baseball (1905, 1910).
 Dan Kolb was a Major League Baseball relief pitcher (1999–2007).
 John Kropke was a defensive tackle in the Canadian Football League (1989–97).
 Charlotte Lewis was a member of the 1976 U.S. Olympic gold medal women's basketball team.
 Cameron Meredith is a National Football League wide receiver (2015–present), currently playing for the New Orleans Saints.
 Jim Meyer is a former NFL offensive tackle (1987). 
Dennis Nelson was a starting offensive tackle for the Super Bowl championship team of the Baltimore Colts during the 1970s.
 Tom Nelson was an NFL  safety for the Cincinnati Bengals, Philadelphia Eagles and Baltimore Ravens.
 Nate Palmer is an NFL linebacker for the Tennessee Titans.
 Mike Prior is a former NFL defensive back (1985, 87–98).  He was a member of the Super Bowl XXXI champion Green Bay Packers.
 James Robinson is an NFL running back for the New York Jets.
 Lorene Ramsey is a retired women's basketball coach of Illinois Central College, who with a career record of 887–197, won more games than any other women's basketball coach at any college level.
 Laurent Robinson was an NFL wide receiver (2007–12), most recently for the Jacksonville Jaguars.
 Mark Rodenhauser was a center for seven NFL teams.
 Cameron Siskowic was a linebacker for the CFL's Hamilton Tiger-Cats (2008–09). 
 Brock Stewart is a Major League Baseball pitcher for the Toronto Blue Jays.
 Kye Stewart was a linebacker with the CFL's Saskatchewan Roughriders (2010–11).
 Colton Underwood was a football player and also on the Bachelor franchise.
 Zeke Upshaw was a professional basketball player
 D. A. Weibring is a PGA golfer.  ISU's golf course is named in his honor.
 Tom Wieghaus is a former Major League Baseball catcher (1981, 83–84).
Jeff Wilkins was a professional basketball player (1977–93).
 Margie Wright was named to the USA Olympic softball team as an assistant coach for the 1996 Atlanta Games, and became in 2000 the softball coach with the most all-time NCAA wins.
 Joe Woods is the defensive coordinator of the NFL's Denver Broncos, champions of Super Bowl 50.
 Mike Zimmer was the former head coach of the NFL's Minnesota Vikings. He was an assistant coach with the Super Bowl XXX champion Dallas Cowboys

Theatre/Movies

 Carlos Bernard (1991), an actor (Tony Almeida on 24). He has also been seen on The Young and the Restless.
 Gary Cole (1978), an actor known for his work on screen (Office Space, Pineapple Express, The Brady Bunch) and television (Midnight Caller, The West Wing, Veep).
 Suzzanne Douglass, an actress (The Parent 'Hood, Tap).
 Nelsan Ellis (attended, transferred in 1999), actor, known for role as Lafayette Reynolds on television series True Blood.
Gary Griffin, producer with the Chicago Shakespeare Theater.
 Moira Harris (1976), actress (Terminator 3: Rise of the Machines).
 LaRoyce Hawkins (2012), actor, known for his role on television series Chicago P.D.
 Reggie Hayes (1991), actor, known for his role on television series Girlfriends
 Sean Hayes, actor, known for his Emmy award–winning role as Jack McFarland on the television series Will & Grace.
 Brendan Hunt, actor/writer (Ted Lasso; Key & Peele)

 Tom Irwin (1979), actor, known for his work on television (Saving Grace My So-Called Life).
 Judith Ivey (1973), two–time Tony Award-winning actress (Steaming, Hurlyburly).
 Terry Kinney (1976), theatrical director and actor (Tim McManus on the television series Oz).
Natasha Leggero, actress and stand-up comedian; appears regularly on the Chelsea Lately roundtable.
 John LeMay, actor, starred in syndicated television show Friday the 13th: The Series.
 Jane Lynch (1982), actress, known for her work on film (Best in Show, A Mighty Wind) and television (Glee).
 John Malkovich (attended, and awarded a degree in 2005), well-known film and theater actor (In the Line of Fire, Rounders, Being John Malkovich) who is a two-time Academy Award nominee.
 David McFadzean, writer and producer, created the TV series Home Improvement and was executive producer for the films Where the Heart Is and What Women Want.
 Laurie Metcalf (1976), one of the six actors to win Tony Awards in consecutive years (2017-2018). She also won three Emmy awards for the role of Jackie on the television series Roseanne.
 William O'Leary (1980), actor (Home Improvement, Hot Shots!).
 Jeff Perry (1978), actor known for his work on television (Scandal, Nash Bridges, Grey's Anatomy).
 Rondi Reed (1977), Tony Award–winning actress (August: Osage County).
 Craig Robinson (1994), actor, The Office; Pineapple Express; Zack and Miri Make a Porno; Knocked Up
 Tim Russ, actor, known for his role as Tuvok on television series Star Trek: Voyager.
 Gary Sinise, Emmy and Golden Globe award-winning, Oscar-nominated film and television actor (CSI: NY, Forrest Gump, Apollo 13)
 Cecilia Suárez, actress who works in both American and Mexican cinema (The Three Burials of Melquiades Estrada, The Air I Breathe).
 Yvonne Suhor, actress (The Young Riders; Northern Exposure)
 Bruce A. Young, actor known for his work in television (The Sentinel) and film (Risky Business, Jurassic Park III).

Other
 Emily Caroline Chandler Hodgin, temperance reformer

References